Acceptable loss is a military euphemism for casualties or destruction inflicted by the enemy that is considered minor or tolerable.

Acceptable loss(es) may also refer to:

 "Acceptable Loss" (Law & Order: Special Victims Unit), an episode in season 14 of TV series Law & Order: Special Victims Unit
 "Acceptable Loss", an episode in season 5 of TV series Burn Notice
 Acceptable Loss, a 2011 novel by Anne Perry
 Acceptable Losses, a 1982 novel by Irwin Shaw
 Acceptable Losses, a 2008 novel by Norman Weissman
 "Acceptable Losses", a 2006 song by Lisa Miskovsky
 "Acceptable Losses", an episode of TV series E-ring
 "Acceptable Losses", an episode of TV series Tour of Duty
 "Acceptable Losses", an episode of TV series The District
An Acceptable Loss, a film by Joe Chappelle